Jyotika Jyoti is a Bangladeshi actress. Her first film, Ayna, directed by Kabori Sarwar, was released in 2005. The next two important releases were Nondito Noroke by Belal Ahmed and Rabeya by Tanvir Mokammel. Later she acted in Tanvir Mokammel's film Jibondhuli and Azad Kalam's Bedeni. Jyoti also acted in a number of short film . her first short film named Break Up was in 2010. she acted in seven short film till 2019. In 2015, she appeared in Morshedul Islam's Anil Bagchir Ekdin as Atoshi, Anil's sister. Jyoti starred in Grash, production of which began in 2013. It was released in 2017.

Early life
Jyotika Jyoti was born in Mymensingh in Bangladesh. She completed a post graduation degree in English literature from Anandamohon University college.

References

Bangladeshi film actresses
Bangladeshi television actresses
Living people
Bangladeshi Hindus
21st-century Bangladeshi actresses
People from Mymensingh District
Best Supporting Actress Bachsas Award winners
Year of birth missing (living people)